The year 575 BC was a year of the pre-Julian Roman calendar. In the Roman Empire, it was known as year 179 Ab urbe condita. The denomination 575 BC for this year has been used since the early medieval period, when the Anno Domini calendar era became the prevalent method in Europe for naming years.

Events
 Temples and public buildings start appearing in Rome. The main temple of Jupiter Optimus Maximus is built.
 Ishtar Gate and throne room wall from Babylon, Iraq is made. The modified version for installation is now on display in Germany.
 Battle of Yanling in Henan Province, China takes place between Jin and Chu forces. The State of Jin is victorious.

Births

Deaths

References